Anthony Missenden (by 1505 – c. 1542), of Healing, Lincolnshire, was an English politician.

He was a Member (MP) of the Parliament of England for Lincoln in 1539 and 1542.

References

1542 deaths
People from Lincoln, England
English MPs 1539–1540
English MPs 1542–1544
Year of birth uncertain